Meyzieu is a commune in the Metropolis of Lyon in Auvergne-Rhône-Alpes region in eastern France. It is a large suburb of Lyon, situated 13 km east of the city centre on the left bank of the Rhône. Before 1967, it was part of the Isère department.

Population

Transport
 Rhônexpress
 Tram T3

See also
Communes of the Metropolis of Lyon

References

External links

 Official website (in French)

Communes of Lyon Metropolis
Dauphiné